Dance partnering is dancing performed by a pair of dancers, typically a male and a female, in which the pair strives to achieve a harmony of coordinated movements so that the audience remains unaware of the mechanics. It relies on the application of partnering dance techniques that facilitate coordinated movements by a pair of dancers. In particular, it usually involves one dancer providing guidance, support, or both, for the other dancer. Dance partnering technique appears in various forms in many types of dance and is an essential part of all partner dances.

Technique

A variety of partner dance techniques are employed in dance partnering. Typically, the technique used for a particular dance style is generally focused on either communication between partners or physical support of one partner by the other.

Guidance
In many partner dances (e.g., ballroom dance) the male dancer typically assumes the role of lead and provides guidance to his typically female partner, the follower. This may simply be a matter of guiding his partner to the next fixed position during a set routine, or in free-form dances may include deciding and communicating the sequence of figures to be danced on the fly.

Support
In a ballet pas de deux, the male dancer may provide support for his partner when she performs balancing feats that would be difficult or impossible without assistance.

Lifts

A dance lift is a sequence of acrobatic movements in which one dancer (typically the male) lifts and, in many cases, holds their dance partner above the floor. In some cases (e.g., Rock and Roll dance), the dance partner may actually be propelled into the air. When performing a lift, the lifting dancer typically strives to gracefully and confidently lift, catch and carry their partner. Dance lifts are commonly performed in various types of dance, including acro, ballet, jive and jitterbug.

External links
Article on partnering in the Australian Ballet Education site.

Ballet technique
Partner dance technique